The Pai striped whiptail (Aspidoscelis pai) is a lizard species of the genus Aspidoscelis, very similar to the Arizona striped whiptail, and endemic to Arizona in the United States.

References

External links
 Online Field Guide to The Reptiles and Amphibians of Arizona

Aspidoscelis
Lizards of North America
Reptiles of the United States
Reptiles described in 1993
Taxa named by John William Wright (herpetologist)
Taxa named by Charles Herbert Lowe
Taxobox binomials not recognized by IUCN